The Lake Hawdon System Important Bird Area comprises an area of   covering a series of five coastal lakes in the Limestone Coast of South Australia. They are the most important of a string of regional lakes occupying swale corridors between modern and historical sand dunes.

Description
The Important Bird Area (IBA) lies between the towns of Robe and Beachport. Characteristics of the lakes are:
 Lake Robe –  much smaller than Lake Hawdon
 Lake St Clair –  similar to Lake Eliza but more saline

Criteria for nomination as an IBA
The wetland system was identified by BirdLife International as an IBA because it regularly supports over 1% of the world populations of red-necked stint, and often of sharp-tailed sandpipers, double-banded plovers and banded stilts. It also provides habitat for orange-bellied parrots, Australasian bitterns, rufous bristlebirds and striated fieldwrens.  The adjacent beaches and offshore islets, from Cowrtie Island to Baudin Rocks, sometimes support breeding fairy terns.

Associated protected areas
While the IBA has no statutory status, it does overlap the following protected areas declared by the South Australian government: Beachport Conservation Park, Lake Robe Game Reserve, Lake St Clair Conservation Park and Little Dip Conservation Park.

See also
List of birds of South Australia

References

Important Bird Areas of South Australia
Limestone Coast